Les amours de Ragonde (The Loves of Ragonde, original title: Le mariage de Ragonde et de Colin ou La Veillée de Village) is an opera in three acts by Jean-Joseph Mouret with a libretto by Philippe Néricault Destouches. It was first performed at the Château de Sceaux in December, 1714. It is one of the first French comic operas.

Performance history
Mouret was in charge of the Grandes Nuits de Sceaux, musical entertainments put on every fortnight by the Duchesse de Maine at her chateau at Sceaux. For the 13th night, in 1714, Mouret and his librettist wrote Le mariage de Ragonde et de Colin. Comedy was something of a novelty in French opera and the work looks forward to the genre of opéra comique which would become popular in the mid-18th century. Mouret also parodied many famous scenes from the prestigious tragédies en musique by Jean-Baptiste Lully, including moments from Armide, Atys and Alceste. 

The next time the opera was heard was after Mouret's death, in a revised version performed by the Académie de musique at its theatre in the Palais-Royal in Paris on 30 January 1742, where it was a great success. It probably inspired Jean-Philippe Rameau to write his own comic opera about an ugly woman, Platée. The musical score of the 1714 version of Ragonde does not survive.

Roles

Synopsis

Act One: La soirée de village (The Village Junket)
Ragonde is an ugly old farmer's widow. At a party in the village she tells the young Colin of her love for him but Colin wants to marry her daughter, Colette, and mocks Ragonde. Lucas, who is also in love with Colette, tells the old woman how she can be revenged on Colin.

Act Two: Les lutins (The Goblins)
Colette is in love with Lucas, but their marriage is dependent on Colin becoming Ragonde's husband, otherwise Ragonde will not allow it. Colette, Lucas and his friend Thibault hatch a plot against Colin. Colette arranges an assignation with him in a wood in the dead of night. Colin arrives at the appointed place only to be terrified by "goblins" who claim to be in the service of the witch Ragonde. In reality, they are boys from the village who have been disguised by Lucas and Thibault. They make Colin promise to marry Ragonde in return for his life.

Act Three: La noce ou le charivari (The Wedding or the Charivari)
The double wedding of Colette and Lucas and Ragonde and Colin takes place. Colin is in tears until Ragonde threatens him with the goblins again. The opera ends with a charivari, noisy music to celebrate the married couples.

Recordings
Les amours de Ragonde (1742 version) Michel Verschaeve, Jean-Paul Fouchécourt, Sophie Marin-Degor, Les Musiciens du Louvre, conducted by Marc Minkowski (Erato, 1992)

Sources
Le magazine de l'opéra baroque by Jean-Claude Brenac
Pitou, Spire, The Paris Opéra. An Encyclopedia of Operas, Ballets, Composers, and Performers – Rococo and Romantic, 1715-1815, Greenwood Press, Westport/London, 1985
Booklet notes to the above recording.
Period printed score: Les Amours de Ragonde ou la Soirée de village représentée par l'Académie royalle de musique, Amsterdam, le Cene, 1745 (accessible for free online at Gallica - B.N.F.)

French-language operas
1714 operas
Operas
Operas by Jean-Joseph Mouret